Cwmbran railway station is in the northeast of Cwmbran town centre, within five minutes' walking distance. It is part of the British railway system owned by Network Rail and is managed by Transport for Wales, who operate all trains serving it. It lies on the Welsh Marches Line from Newport to Hereford. The station was opened at this site in 1986 to serve the commuter route to Newport and Cardiff, and shoppers to the town centre.

History
Historically, a number of railway stations served Cwmbran. The first station was opened by the Monmouthshire Railway and Canal Company in July 1852 or April 1878. This closed on 11 March 1880 and a new station was opened on the same day by the Great Western Railway. The station was located on a spur which linked the Monmouthshire Railway with the Pontypool, Caerleon and Newport Railway. This closed to passengers on 30 April 1962 and to goods on 17 May 1965. The first station, which had remained open for goods traffic, also closed on 17 May 1965.

The Monmouthshire Railway line to Blaenavon ran to the west of the town. The section between Pontypool and Blaenavon closed to passengers 30 April 1962, the mineral branches followed on 7 April 1969 and the branch to Talywain on 3 May 1980. The section from Pontypool as far as Oakfield Siding near Cwmbran saw coal traffic until 1980.

New station

The present station was opened by British Rail on 12 May 1986.

Facilities

Refurbished facilities at the station were officially opened by Rhodri Morgan AM on Friday 14 March 2008. This included a larger car park, a new ticket hall, modern sheltered seating areas and new live departure boards like those seen at Newport. The booking office is open six days per week; there is also a self-service ticket machine on offer for use or to collect advance purchase tickets. Automatic announcements and timetable poster boards offer train running information in addition to the CIS displays mentioned. Level access is on offer to each side, though for the southbound platform, this requires a long detour via public roads (the footbridge linking the platforms has steps).

In addition to this, Torfaen County Borough Council have funded a limited Number 4 bus that serves the town centre and suburbs of Cwmbran, which is currently operated by Stagecoach in South Wales.

Service
Most Sunday services only run on the former route (there are only two services each way to/from Holyhead).

References

Notes

Sources

External links

Pictures of Cwmbran Station from Railway Photography by 37430

Railway stations in Torfaen
DfT Category E stations
Railway stations opened by British Rail
Railway stations in Great Britain opened in 1986
Railway stations served by Transport for Wales Rail
Cwmbran